The Serra do Cipó National Park is a national park in the state of Minas Gerais, Brazil.

Location

The park is in the Cerrado biome.
It was created by decree 90.223 of 25 September 1984, modified by decree 94.984 of 30 September 1987.
It is administered by the Chico Mendes Institute for Biodiversity Conservation.
It lies in the municipalities of Itabira, Itambé do Mato Dentro, Jaboticatubas, Nova União, Morro do Pilar and Santana do Riacho, Minas Gerais.

Conservation

The park is classified as IUCN protected area category II (national park).
It has the objectives of preserving natural ecosystems of great ecological relevance and scenic beauty, enabling scientific research, environmental education, outdoors recreation and eco-tourism.
Protected species include the maned wolf (Chrysocyon brachyurus), ocelot (Leopardus pardalis), cougar (Puma concolor), white-necked hawk (Buteogallus lacernulatus), the lizard Placosoma cipoense, the fish Characidium lagosantense and the butterfly Nirodia belphegor.

Notes

Sources

1984 establishments in Brazil
National parks of Brazil
Protected areas of Minas Gerais
Cerrado